Lewis Arthur Tambs (July 7, 1927 — October 19, 2017) was an American ambassador to Colombia from 1983–1985 and Costa Rica from 1985–1987. Tambs was born in San Diego, California.

References

External links

1927 births
2017 deaths
Ambassadors of the United States to Costa Rica
Ambassadors of the United States to Colombia
People from San Diego
University of California, Santa Barbara alumni
University of California, Berkeley alumni